Sebastian Munulo is a businessman and hotel owner in Uganda. In 2012, the New Vision newspaper listed him among the wealthiest people in Uganda.

Businesses and investments
Among his holdings are the  Mwaana Highway Hotel in Iganga, the Mwaana Nursery and Primary School in Iganga, the Mwaana Highway Hotel in Ndeeba, residential houses for rent in Iganga, and large tracts of land in Iganga District.

See also
 List of wealthiest people in Uganda

References

Living people
1960 births
People from Iganga District
People from Eastern Region, Uganda
Ugandan businesspeople